"Bola Rebola" is a song by Brazilian producer duo Tropkillaz, Colombian singer J Balvin and Brazilian recording artist Anitta featuring MC Zaac. The song was written by Tropkillaz, Anitta, J Balvin, Isaac Daniel Junior, Hailey Leane Collier and Jazelle Paris Rodriguez and produced by the first. It was released as a single on February 22, 2019, through label Universal Music. The song features lines in Portuguese, English and Spanish and has been classified by O Globo as a crossover of funk carioca with multiple genres.

Background and release

In December, 2017, Brazilian recording artist Anitta released "Vai Malandra", a funk carioca collaboration with Maejor, Tropkillaz, MC Zaac and DJ Yuri Martins as the conclusion of her Check Mate project. The song instantly became a hit, receiving over one million plays on Spotify on its first day of release and breaking the record for the most streams received in a day in Brazil – held previously by Taylor Swift's "Look What You Made Me Do". On its second day of release, the song was played more than two million times, surpassing once again the record for the most streamed song in a day in Brazil. Due to the amount of streams received on its first days of release, the song even debuted on the Global Top 50 chart in Spotify and became the first song in Portuguese to hit the top 20 on that chart on December 20, 2017.

In 2019, Tropkillaz announced a new collaboration with Anitta and MC Zaac titled "Bola Rebola", which also was announced to feature Colombian recording artist J Balvin. According to Tropkillaz, Anitta contacted Balvin and asked him if he would join the song, to which he accepted. The produced duo intended to release the song in time for the Carnival of 2019 so it could become "the carnival anthem". The song instantly became a hit and was the most streamed song on Spotify in Brazil for over 30 days.

Track listing
Digital download
 "Bola Rebola" – 3:13

Credits and personnel
Vocals – J Balvin, Anitta, MC Zaac
Songwriting – Tropkillaz, Anitta, J Balvin, Isaac Daniel Junior, Hailey Leane Collier and Jazelle Paris Rodriguez 
Production – Tropkillaz

Charts

Weekly charts

Year-end charts

Certifications

References

2019 songs
2019 singles
Portuguese-language songs
Macaronic songs
Spanish-language songs
J Balvin songs
Anitta (singer) songs
Songs written by Anitta (singer)
Songs written by J Balvin
Trap music songs